Frances Helen Prideaux MB (1858 – 29 November 1885) was a physician and "one of the most distinguished students" of the London School of Medicine for Women. Her academic and professional success caused changes in the stance of influential people who had been opposed to women in medicine.

Career 
In 1877, Prideaux was signatory to a letter addressed to the Chancellor and Senate of the University of London expressing thanks for steps taken and urging more to be done to grant medical degrees to women. One year later, she passed the General Examination for Women (equivalent to matriculation) from the university.

Prideaux obtained both BS and MB degrees with honours in 1884. She won the gold medal from the University of London for her performance in anatomy.

Prideaux worked as a demonstrator of physiology and anatomy at the London School of Medicine for Women. She worked at Bethlem Hospital and the Elizabeth Garrett Anderson Hospital.

In 1885, Prideaux applied for a job as house surgeon at the Paddington Green Children's Hospital. Applications were open to women and men candidates. When Prideaux was selected for the job in November 1885, she became the first woman to be appointed to a London hospital who had been chosen over male applicants.

Death and legacy 
Four weeks after her appointment, Prideaux died from diphtheria, likely contracted from one of her patients. Before her death, she had been given a tracheotomy and then a laryngotomy and had helped with her own treatment. She had refused to let loved ones be at her side during her treatment and death to protect them from also becoming ill.

Prideaux's death was publicly mourned. Her death was reported in the British Medical Journal, which linked her death with that of Robert Lawson, house surgeon at St Thomas, as an example of the dangers inherent in the profession.

A memorial fund was created in Prideaux's name, administered by Henrietta Stanley, Baroness Stanley of Alderley and Elizabeth Garrett Anderson. Sir William Gull was an early and notable contributor to the fund. Gull had been against the idea of women becoming doctors but described Prideaux's achievements as "vindicat[ing] the right of women to take the highest position in a difficult and intellectual profession."

Sophia Jex-Blake wrote of Prideaux's achievements alongside those of Mary Scharlieb, who gained a gold medal in obstetrics in 1882, and quoted Gull's speech at the memorial scholarship meeting.

In 2004, an oil painting of Prideaux from 1886 was recorded as being held at the Royal Free Hospital.

References

External links 
 The Prideaux family papers are held at Bristol Archives.

1858 births
1885 deaths
British women medical doctors
Alumni of the University of London
Alumni of the London School of Medicine for Women
19th-century women physicians